Kari Bertil Puisto (born 25 August 1945) is a Finnish former racing cyclist. He won the Finnish national road race title in 1975 and 1976. He also competed at the 1980 Summer Olympics.

References

External links
 

1945 births
Living people
Finnish male cyclists
People from Karvia
Olympic cyclists of Finland
Cyclists at the 1980 Summer Olympics
Sportspeople from Satakunta